1,1,6-Trimethyl-1,2-dihydronaphthalene (TDN) is an aroma compound present in wine, particularly aged Rieslings.  Chemically, it is classified as a 13C-norisoprenoid, as it has thirteen carbon atoms, and is derived from an isoprenoid by the loss of methylene groups.

In wines, 1,1,6-trimethyl-1,2-dihydronaphthalene is generally considered to contribute to a desirable aroma in low concentrations, but an undesirable aroma in higher concentrations. The aroma is commonly described as a petrol note or by the French term goût de pétrole. 

1,1,6-Trimethyl-1,2-dihydronaphthalene is believed to be a degradation product of β-carotene and lutein.  1,1,6-Trimethyl-1,2-dihydronaphthalene can also by synthesized in the laboratory from either of the ionones, α-ionone or β-ionone.

References

Flavors
Terpenes and terpenoids
Oenology